Glock is a brand of polymer-framed, short recoil-operated, locked-breech semi-automatic pistols designed and produced by Austrian manufacturer Glock Ges.m.b.H.

The firearm entered Austrian military and police service by 1982 after becoming the top performer in reliability and safety tests.

Glock pistols have become the company's most profitable line of products, and have been supplied to national armed forces, security agencies, and police forces in at least 48 countries. Glocks are also popular firearms among civilians for recreational and competition shooting, home- and self-defense, both in concealed or open carry. In 2020, the Glock 19 was the best selling pistol on GunBroker.

History 
The company's founder, head engineer Gaston Glock, had no experience with firearms design or manufacture at the time their first pistol, the Glock17, was being prototyped. Glock had extensive experience in advanced synthetic polymers, which was instrumental in the company's design of the first commercially successful line of pistols with a polymer frame. Glock introduced ferritic nitrocarburizing into the firearms industry as an anticorrosion surface treatment for metal gun parts.

Development 
In 1980, the Austrian Armed Forces announced that it would seek tenders for a new, modern duty pistol to replace their World War II–era Walther P38 handguns. The Federal Ministry of Defence of Austria formulated a list of 17 criteria for the new generation service pistol, including requirements that it would be self loading; fire the NATO-standard 9×19mm Parabellum round; the magazines were not to require any means of assistance for loading; be secure against accidental discharge from shock, strike, and drop from a height of  onto a steel plate. After firing 15,000 rounds of standard ammunition, the pistol was to be inspected for wear. The pistol was to then be used to fire an overpressure test cartridge generating .

Glock became aware of the Austrian Army's planned procurement, and in 1982, assembled a team of Europe's leading handgun experts from military, police, and civilian sport-shooting circles to define the most desirable characteristics in a combat pistol. Within three months, Glock had developed a working prototype that combined proven mechanisms and traits from previous pistol designs. In addition, the plan was to make extensive use of synthetic materials and modern manufacturing technologies, which led to the Glock17 becoming a cost-effective candidate.

Several samples of the Glock17 (so named because it was the 17th patent procured by the company) were submitted for assessment trials in early 1982, and after passing all of the exhaustive endurance and abuse tests, the Glock emerged as the winner. According to Friedrich Dechant, former Head of the Austrian Armaments and Defence Technology Agency, the Glock P80 was clearly superior to other handguns in terms of performance, handling, charging capacity and price.

The handgun was adopted into service with the Austrian military and police forces in 1982 as the Pistole 80 (P80), with an initial order for 25,000 guns. The Glock17 outperformed eight different pistols from five other established manufacturers (Heckler & Koch of Germany offered their P7M8, P7M13, and P9S, SIG Sauer of Switzerland bid with their P220 and P226 models, Beretta of Italy submitted their model 92SB-F, FN Herstal of Belgium proposed an updated variant of the Browning Hi-Power, and the Austrian Steyr Mannlicher entered the competition with the GB).

The results of the Austrian trials sparked a wave of interest in Western Europe and overseas, particularly in the United States, where a similar effort to select a service-wide replacement for the M1911 had been going on since the late 1970s (known as the Joint Service Small Arms Program). In late 1983, the United States Department of Defense inquired about the Glock pistol and received four samples of the Glock17 for unofficial evaluation. Glock was then invited to participate in the XM9 Personal Defense Pistol Trials, but declined because the DOD specifications would require extensive retooling of production equipment and providing 35 test samples in an unrealistic time frame.

In 1985, after joint Norwegian and Swedish trials from 1983 to 1985, the Glock17 was accepted into service as the P80 in Norway, and in 1988 as the Pistol 88 in Sweden, where it surpassed all prior NATO durability standards. As a result, the Glock17 became a standard NATO-classified sidearm and was granted a NATO Stock Number (1005-25-133-6775). By 1992, some 350,000pistols had been sold in more than 45countries, including 250,000 in the United States alone.

Starting in 2013, the British Armed Forces began replacing the Browning Hi-Power pistol with the Glock17Gen4, due to concerns about weight and the external safety of the Hi-Power. The British preferred the Glock17Gen4 over the Beretta Px4 Storm, FN FNP, Heckler & Koch P30, SIG SauerP226, Smith & Wesson M&P, and Steyr M9A1 of which 19 pistols each, all chambered in 9×19mmParabellum, were entered in the R9GSP trials.

The French Armed Forces (FAF) in 2020 began replacing their MAC Mle 1950 and, to a lesser extent, their PAMAS G1 pistols with Glock17Gen5 models specifically made for the FAF. The French preferred the Glock17Gen5 over the HS2000 and CZ P-10 offerings that also made it to the final selection phase.

Product evolution 
Glock has updated its basic design several times throughout its production history.

First-generation models 

The first-generation (Gen 1) Glock pistols are most notably recognized by their smoother "pebble finish" grip and finger groove-less frames. The Gen 1 frame pattern and design was used by Glock from 1982 through 1988 and pre-dates the checkered grip patterns used in the second generation of Glock pistols. The first Glock17s imported to the US were serialized with an alpha-numeric (two-letter prefix followed by three numbers) stamped into the slide, barrel, and a small metal plate inserted into the bottom side of the polymer frame. The first documented Glock17s (by serial number) imported into the US were from the AF000series in January 1986, followed by AH000, AK000, and AL000. These early Glock(Gen 1) pistols (serial number prefixAF through AM) were also manufactured with a barrel that had a smaller overall diameter and thinner bore walls, later known as "pencil barrels". These early Glock17 "pencil barrel" pistols are considered rare and highly desirable by Glock collectors. The barrels were later redesigned with thicker bore walls and manufacturing continued to evolve and improve the design of Glock pistols.

Many of the first-generation Glocks were shipped and sold in the iconic "Tupperware" style plastic boxes. The earliest Glock boxes had ammunition storage compartments that allowed for 17 rounds of 9mm to be stored with the pistol. This box design was later changed by Glock to meet BATF import requirements and the ammunition storage compartments were removed.

Second-generation models 

A mid-life upgrade to the Glock pistols involved the addition of checkering on the front strap and trigger guard and checkering and serrations to the back strap. These versions, introduced in 1988, were informally referred to as "second-generation" models. To meet American ATF regulations, a steel plate with a stamped serial number was embedded into the receiver in front of the trigger guard. In 1991, an integrated recoil spring assembly replaced the original two-piece recoil spring and tube design. The magazine was slightly modified, changing the floorplate and fitting the follower spring with a resistance insert at its base.

Third-generation models 

In 1998, the frame was further modified with an accessory rail (called the "Universal Glock rail") similar to a picatinny rail to allow the mounting of laser sights, tactical lights, and other accessories. Thumb rests on both sides of the frame and finger grooves on the front strap were added. Glock pistols with these upgrades are informally referred to as (early) "third-generation" models. Later third-generation models additionally featured a modified extractor that serves as a loaded chamber indicator, and the locking block was enlarged, along with the addition of an extra cross pin to aid the distribution of bolt thrust forces exerted by the locking block. This cross pin is known as the locking block pin and is located above the trigger pin.

The polymer frames of third-generation models can be black, flat dark earth, or olive drab. Besides that, non-firing dummy pistols ("P"models) and non-firing dummy pistols with resetting triggers ("R"models) have a bright red frame, and Simunition-adapted practice pistols ("T"models) a bright blue frame for easy identification.

In 2009, the Glock22RTF2 (Rough Textured Frame 2) (chambered in .40 S&W) was introduced. This pistol featured a new checkering texture around the grip and new scalloped (fish gill-shaped) serrations at the rear of the sides of the slide. Many of the existing models became available in the RTF2version, including the 31, 32, 23, 21, and 19. Some of those did not have the fish gills.

Fourth-generation models 

At the 2010 SHOT Show, Glock presented the "fourth generation", now dubbed "Gen4" by Glock itself. Updates centered on ergonomics and the recoil spring assembly. The initial two fourth-generation models announced were the full-sized Glock 17 and Glock 22, chambered for the 9×19 mm Parabellum and .40 S&W cartridges, respectively. The pistols were displayed with a modified rough-textured frame, grip checkering, and interchangeable backstraps of different sizes. "Gen4" is rollmarked on the slide next to the model number to identify the fourth-generation pistols.

The basic grip size of the fourth-generation Glock pistols is slightly smaller compared to the previous design. With the medium backstrap installed, the grip size is identical to the third-generation pistols. The magazine release catches are enlarged and reversible for left-handed use. To use the exchangeable magazine release feature, fourth-generation Glock magazines have a notch cut on both sides of the magazine body. Earlier versions of the magazines will not lock into the Gen4 pistols if the user has moved the magazine release button to be operated by a left-handed user. Gen4 magazines will work in older models.

Mechanically, fourth-generation Glock pistols are fitted with a dual recoil spring assembly to help reduce perceived recoil and increase service life expectancy. Earlier subcompact Glock models such as the Glock 26 and Glock 30 have already used a dual recoil spring assembly that was carried over to the fourth-generation versions of those models. The slide and barrel shelf have been resized, and the front portion of the polymer frame has been widened and internally enlarged, to accommodate the dual recoil spring assembly. The trigger mechanism housing has also been modified to fit into the smaller-sized grip space.

The introduction of fourth-generation Glock pistols continued in July 2010 when the Glock 19 and Glock 23, the reduced size "compact" versions of the Glock 17 and Glock 22, became available for retail. In late 2010, Glock continued the introduction of fourth-generation models with the Glock 26 and Glock 27 "subcompact" variants.

In January 2013, more fourth-generation Glock pistols were introduced commercially during the annual SHOT Show, including the Glock 20 Generation 4 along with other fourth-generation Glock models.

2011 recoil spring assembly exchange program
In September 2011, Glock announced a recoil spring exchange program in which the manufacturer voluntarily offers to exchange the recoil spring assemblies of its fourth-generation pistols (with the exception of the "subcompact" Glock 26 and Glock 27 models) sold before 22 July 2011 at no cost "to ensure our products perform up to GLOCK's stringent standards", according to the company.

M series 
On 29 June 2016, the United States Federal Bureau of Investigation (FBI) awarded a contract to Glock to provide new 9×19mm Parabellum chambered duty pistols. The solicitation specifications deviated from the specifications of Glock fourth-generation models.

In August 2016, the Indianapolis Metro Police Department (IMPD) started training with a batch of Glock 17M pistols. The most obvious difference with the Glock third- and fourth-generation models on published images is the omission of finger grooves on the grip. In October of that year, the IMPD issued a 17M voluntary recall following failures encountered while dry firing the pistols during training. According to Major Riddle with the IMPD, "Glock is working to correct the problem and we hope to begin issuing the new [17Ms] as soon as December."

Fifth-generation models 
In August 2017, Glock presented the "fifth generation" or "Gen 5". The revisions centered on ergonomics and improving reliability. Many parts of fifth-generation Glock pistols cannot be interchanged with those of the previous generations. The two fifth-generation models announced were the Glock 17 and Glock 19, chambered for the 9×19mm Parabellum. Some conspicuous changes on the fifth-generation models are ambidextrous slide stop levers, DLC surface finish for barrel and slide, a barrel featuring a revised style of polygonal rifling (called the "Glock Marksman Barrel" by Glock), a deeper recessed barrel crown, omission of the finger grooves on the grip, a flared magazine well, and a reintroduction of a half-moon-shaped cutout on the bottom front of the grip. The locking block pin located above the trigger pin that was introduced in the third generation is omitted. Many internal parts were less conspicuously revised. "Gen 5" is rollmarked on the slide next to the model number to identify the fifth-generation pistols. The "Gen 5" slide can feature front serrations (FS) to provide an additional tactile traction surface choice. The magazines were also revised for the fifth-generation models: the redesigned magazine floor plates feature a frontward protruding lip to offer grip for manual assisted extraction and the magazine follower became orange colored for easier visual identification.

Design details

Operating mechanism 
The Glock 17 is a short recoil–operated, locked-breech semi-automatic pistol that uses a modified Browning cam-lock system adapted from the Hi-Power pistol. The firearm's locking mechanism uses a linkless, vertically tilting barrel with a rectangular breech that locks into the ejection port cut-out in the slide. During the recoil stroke, the barrel moves rearward initially locked together with the slide about  until the bullet leaves the barrel and chamber pressure drops to a safe level. A ramped lug extension at the base of the barrel then interacts with a tapered locking block integrated into the frame, forcing the barrel down and unlocking it from the slide. This camming action terminates the barrel's movement while the slide continues back under recoil, extracting and ejecting the spent cartridge casing. The slide's uninterrupted rearward movement and counter-recoil cycle are characteristic of the Browning system.

Glock pistols incorporate a number of features intended to enhance reliability in adverse conditions, such as utilizing advanced metal coatings, "stub" slide guides instead of true frame rails, and an unusual cocking mechanism wherein the trigger is partially responsible for cocking the striker. By relying partially on force from the shooter's trigger finger to cock the striker, a Glock effectively reduces the load on the recoil spring as the slide moves forward into battery, whereas almost all other striker-fired pistols on the market rely fully on the recoil spring to cock the striker. This design gives the recoil spring fewer tasks as the action cycles, helping to ensure that sufficient energy is available to strip a new round from the magazine and achieve full battery even when the breech, chamber, and/or magazine are heavily fouled. For these and other reasons, Glock pistols are commonly considered to be some of the most reliable striker-fired, semi-automatic handguns available, with some independent testing even showing a Glock taking a lead over a SIG Sauer P320 in a wet/dry reliability test, even though the latter was selected as the winner of the U.S. Army's MHS competition.

Features 

The slide features a spring-loaded claw extractor, and the stamped sheet metal ejector is pinned to the trigger mechanism housing. Pistols after 2002 have a reshaped extractor that serves as a loaded chamber indicator. When a cartridge is present in the chamber, a tactile metal edge protrudes slightly out immediately behind the ejection port on the right side of the slide. The striker firing mechanism has a spring-loaded firing pin that is cocked in two stages that the firing pin spring powers. When the pistol is charged, the firing pin is in the half-cock position. As the trigger is pulled, the firing pin is then fully cocked. At the end of its travel, the trigger bar is tilted downward by the connector, releasing the firing pin to fire the cartridge. The connector resets the trigger bar so that the firing pin will be captured in half-cock at the end of the firing cycle. This is known as a preset trigger mechanism, referred to as the "Safe action" trigger by the manufacturer. The connector ensures the pistol can only fire semiautomatically.

In response to a request made by American law enforcement agencies for a two-stage trigger with increased trigger pull, Glock introduced the NY1 (New York) trigger module, which features a flat spring in a plastic housing that replaces the trigger bar's standard coil spring.

The Glock's frame, magazine body, and several other components are made from a high-strength nylon-based polymer invented by Gaston Glock, called Polymer 2. This plastic was specially formulated to provide increased durability and is more resilient than carbon steel and most steel alloys. Polymer 2 is resistant to shock, caustic liquids, and temperature extremes where traditional steel/alloy frames would warp and become brittle. The injection-molded frame contains four hardened steel guide rails for the slide: two at the rear of the frame, and the remaining pair above and in front of the trigger guard. The trigger guard itself is squared off at the front and checkered. The grip has an angle of 109° and a nonslip, stippled surface on the sides and both the front and rear straps. The frame houses the locking block, which is an investment casting that engages a 45° camming surface on the barrel's lower camming lug. It is retained in the frame by a steel axis pin that holds the trigger and slide catch. The trigger housing is held to the frame by means of a polymer pin. A spring-loaded sheet-metal pressing serves as the slide catch, which is secured from unintentional manipulation by a raised guard molded into the frame. Because of its polymer construction, there were initially fears that Glock pistols would be invisible to airport X-ray machines, making them easy to illegally import into the United States. In actuality, 84% of the gun's weight is from steel, and Polymer 2 is visible to X-ray machines. The myth's prevalence is believed to be connected to a scene that perpetuated the myth in Die Hard 2, which released a few years after the Glock was invented. In 1988, the Undetectable Firearms Act was passed in the United States, banning the manufacture or import of any gun that could pass undetected through a metal detector.

The Glock pistol has a relatively low slide profile, which holds the barrel axis close to the shooter's hand and makes the pistol more comfortable to fire by reducing muzzle rise and allows for faster aim recovery in rapid firing sequences. The rectangular slide is milled from a single block of ordnance-grade steel using CNC machinery. The barrel and slide undergo two hardening processes prior to treatment with a proprietary nitriding process called Tenifer. The Tenifer treatment is applied in a  nitrate bath.

The Tenifer process produces a matte gray-colored, nonglare surface with a 64 Rockwell C hardness rating and a 99% resistance to salt water corrosion (which meets or exceeds stainless steel specifications), making the Glock particularly suitable for individuals carrying the pistol concealed as the highly chloride-resistant finish allows the pistol to better endure the effects of perspiration. Glock steel parts using the Tenifer treatment are more corrosion resistant than analogous gun parts having other finishes or treatments, including Teflon, bluing, hard chrome plating, or phosphates. During 2010, Glock switched from the salt bath nitriding Tenifer process to a not exactly disclosed gas nitriding process. After applying the nitriding process, a black Parkerized decorative surface finish is applied. The underlying nitriding treatment will remain, protecting these parts even if the decorative surface finish were to wear off.

A fourth generation Glock 17 consists of 34 parts. For maintenance, the pistol disassembles into five main groups: the barrel, slide, frame, magazine, and recoil-spring assembly. The firearm is designed for the NATO-standard 9×19mm Parabellum pistol cartridge, but can use high-power (increased pressure) +P ammunition with either full-metal-jacket or jacketed hollow-point projectiles.

Barrel 
The hammer-forged barrel has a female type polygonal rifling with a right-hand twist. The stabilization of the round is not by conventional rifling, using lands and grooves, but rather through a polygonal profile consisting of a series of six or eight interconnected noncircular segments (only the .45 ACP and .45 GAP have octagonal polygonal rifling). Each depressed segment within the interior of the barrel is the equivalent of a groove in a conventional barrel. Thus, the interior of the barrel consists of smooth arcs of steel rather than sharply defined slots.

Instead of using a traditional broaching machine to cut the rifling into the bore, the hammer forging process involves beating a slowly rotating mandrel through the bore to obtain the hexagonal or octagonal shape. As a result, the barrel's thickness in the area of each groove is not compromised as with conventional square-cut barrels. This has the advantage of providing a better gas seal behind the projectile as the bore has a slightly smaller diameter, which translates into more efficient use of the combustion gases trapped behind the bullet, slightly greater (consistency in) muzzle velocities, and increased accuracy and ease of maintenance.

The newer lines of Glock pistols—i.e. Gen5, G42/43—are equipped with the Glock Marksmanship Barrel, or GMB. While older barrels were somewhat difficult to identify a bullet as coming from a particular barrel with high enough reliability for evidentiary use, the newer GMB ones are designed differently. A study by Stephen Christen and Hans Rudolf Jordi, published by Forensic Science International in February 2019, shows that the new GMB barrels leave more identifiably unique markings on the fired projectile. These marks were more easily identified than previous pistol barrel markings, and were sufficient for reliably tying a bullet to a particular barrel. The study used a comparison microscope and an ABIS (Evofinder).

Safety 
Glock pistols lack a traditional on-off safety lever, which Glock markets as an advantage, especially to police departments, as the user is able to fire immediately without separately manipulating a safety. Instead, the pistols are designed with three independent safety mechanisms to prevent accidental discharge. The system, designated "Safe Action" by Glock, consists of an external integrated trigger safety and two automatic internal safeties: a firing pin safety and a drop safety. The external safety is a small inner lever contained in the trigger. Pressing the lever activates the trigger bar and sheet metal connector. The firing pin safety is a solid hardened steel pin that, in the secured state, blocks the firing pin channel (disabling the firing pin in its longitudinal axis). It is pushed upward to release the firing pin for firing only when the trigger is actuated and the safety is pushed up through the backward movement of the trigger bar. The drop safety guides the trigger bar in a ramp that is released only when direct rearward pressure is applied to the trigger. The three safety mechanisms are automatically disengaged one after the other when the trigger is squeezed, and are automatically reactivated when the trigger is released.

In 2003, Glock announced the Internal Locking System (ILS) safety feature named Glock Safety Lock. The ILS is a manually activated lock located in the back of the pistol's grip. It is cylindrical in design and, according to Glock, each key is unique. When activated, the lock causes a tab to protrude from the rear of the grip, giving both a visual and tactile indication as to whether the lock is engaged or not. When activated, the ILS renders the Glock unfireable, as well as making it impossible to disassemble. When disengaged, the ILS adds no further safety mechanisms to the Glock pistol. The ILS is available as an option on most Glock pistols. Glock pistols cannot be retrofitted to accommodate the ILS. The lock must be factory-built in Austria and shipped as a special order.

Feeding

The Glock 17 feeds from staggered-column or double stack magazines that have a 17-round capacity (which can be extended to 19 with an optional floor plate) or optional 24 or 33-round high-capacity magazines. For jurisdictions which restrict magazine capacity to 10 rounds, Glock offers single-stack, 10-round magazines. The magazines are made of steel and are overmolded with plastic. A steel spring drives a plastic follower. After the last cartridge has been fired, the slide remains open on the slide stop. The slide stop release lever is located on the left side of the frame directly beneath the slide and can be manipulated by the thumb of the right-handed shooter.

Glock magazines are interchangeable between models of the same caliber, meaning that a compact or subcompact pistol will accept magazines designed for the larger pistols chambered for the same round. However, magazines designed for compact and subcompact models will not function in larger pistols because they are not tall enough to reach the slide and magazine release. For example, the subcompact Glock 26 will accept magazines from both the full-size Glock 17 and the compact Glock 19, but the Glock 17 will not accept magazines from the smaller Glock 19 or the Glock 26. The magazines for the Glock 36, the Glock 42, the Glock 43, and the Glock 44 are all unique; they cannot use magazines intended for another model, nor can their magazines be used in other models.

Sights 

The first Glock pistols sent to the United States in 1985 failed to meet the BATF import "points" requirement, requiring Glock to quickly develop an adjustable rear sight which allowed for the pistols to be imported and sold commercially in 1986. It is believed that Glock designed and created this adjustable rear sight over a weekend in order to meet the ATF's importation requirements, and so it was dubbed the "weekend" sight. These first-generation adjustable rear sights extended past the slide and were susceptible to breaking. Even on later models, the front sight can easily become misshapen from friction against the holster, leading to replacements with metal sights, or tritium illuminated night sights.

More commonly today, the Glock 17 has a fixed polymer combat-type sighting arrangement that consists of a ramped front sight and a notched rear sight with white contrast elements painted on for increased acquisition speed – a white dot on the front post and a rectangular border on the rear notch. Some newer rear sights can be adjusted for windage (on certain models due to the windage sights not coming as factory default), as it has a degree of lateral movement in the dovetail it is mounted in.

Accessories 
The Glock pistol accessories available from the factory include several devices for tactical illumination, such as a series of front rail-mounted "Glock tactical lights" featuring a white tactical light and an optional visible laser sight. An alternate version of the tactical light using an invisible infrared light and laser sight is available, designed to be used with an infrared night vision device. Another lighting accessory is an adapter to mount a flashlight onto the bottom of a magazine.

Polymer holsters in various configurations and matching magazine pouches are available. In addition, Glock produces optional triggers, recoil springs, slide stops, magazine release levers, and maritime spring cups. Maritime spring cups are designed to allow the pistol to be fired immediately after being submerged in water. They feature additional openings that allow liquids to flow and escape around them, offering enhanced reliability when water has penetrated into the firing pin assembly channel.

Magazine floor plates (or +2 baseplates), which expand the capacity of the standard magazines by two rounds, are available for models chambered for the 9×19mm Parabellum, .45 GAP, .40 S&W, .357 SIG, and .380 ACP cartridges. In addition to the standard nonadjustable polymer sight line, three alternative sight lines are offered by Glock. These consist of steel, adjustable, and self-illuminating tritium night rear sights and factory steel and self-illuminating tritium contrast pointer steel front sights.

Glock switch 

A Glock switch is an aftermarket accessory which depresses the firearm's sear allowing fully automatic fire. They are illegal in the United States.

Commemorative, anniversary, engraved, and other rare Glocks 
Glock began producing limited edition and commemorative Glocks in 1991. Glock later produced a series of anniversary models to celebrate business milestones and in honor of 20, 25, and 30 years of US sales. Additionally, many law enforcement agencies had the department name, logo, or badges engraved on the slides of issued duty weapons.

Variants 
Following the introduction of the Glock 17, numerous variants and versions have been offered. Variants that differ in caliber, frame, and slide length are identified by different model numbers with the exception of the Glock 17L, 19X, and 43X.

Glock pistols are made in five form factors, all modeled after the original full-sized Glock 17. "Standard" models are designed as full-sized duty firearms with a large magazine capacity. "Compact" models are slightly smaller with reduced magazine capacity and lighter weight while maintaining a usable grip length. "Subcompact" models are designed for easier carry and being lighter and shorter, are intended to be used with two fingers on the grip below the trigger guard and lack an accessory rail like the larger, after generation two, Glock models. The .45 ACP and 10mm Auto models have bigger, wider slides and are slightly larger than the smaller-chambered pistols and are available in the subcompact models Glock 29 (10mm Auto) and Glock 30 (.45 ACP). Glock produces five models of single-stack "Slimline" subcompact pistols, the Glock 36 in .45 ACP, the Glock 42 in .380 ACP, and the Glock 43, 43x, and 48 in 9×19mm. The 43x and the 48 have longer grips that allow for a full three-finger hold and a 10-round capacity. "Competition" versions have longer barrels and slides, adjustable sights, an extended slide and magazine release.

Beginning in 2007, Glock introduced several "Short Frame" models designated by the suffix "SF". The short frame was originally designed to compete in the now cancelled U.S. military Joint Combat Pistol trials for a new .45 ACP pistol to replace the M9 pistol. Glock's entry featured an optional ambidextrous magazine release and MIL-STD-1913 rail along with a reduction in the size of the backstrap. The Glock 21SF is currently available in three versions: one with a Picatinny rail and ambidextrous magazine release and two with a Universal Glock rail available with or without the ambidextrous magazine release. Current 10mm and .45 ACP Glock magazines are manufactured with ambidextrous magazine release cutouts. As of January 2009, the Glock 20, 21, 29, and 30 were offered in short-framed variations. These models incorporate a  reduction in trigger reach, and full-sized models feature a  reduction in heel depth, which corresponds to an overall reduction in length for those models.

9×19mm Parabellum 
 Glock 17: The Glock 17 is the original 9×19mm Parabellum model, with a standard magazine capacity of 17 rounds, introduced in 1982. Several modified versions of the Glock 17 have been introduced:
 Glock 17L: Introduced in 1988, the 17L incorporates a longer slide and extended barrel. Initially, the Glock 17L had three holes in the top of the barrel and a corresponding slot in the slide; however, later production pistols lack the holes in the barrel. The Glock 17L is manufactured in limited quantities.
 Glock 17C: Introduced in 1996, the 17C incorporates slots cut in the barrel and slide to compensate for recoil. Many other Glock pistols now come with this option, all with a "C" suffix on the slide.
 Glock 17MB: The 17MB is a version with ambidextrous magazine catch. This model, along with the other MB variants, was no longer available upon the introduction of the fourth-generation models, which have a reversible magazine catch.
 Glock 17M: Introduced in 2016, the 17M was created in response to an FBI solicitation for a new full-size 9mm pistol. Differences from the Generation 4 model include removal of the finger grooves, ambidextrous slide lock, rounded slide nose profile, flared magazine well with new magazine baseplates, and a tougher finish on metal components. The Glock 17M also abandons the polygonal rifling of previous models for conventional rifling. , the Federal Bureau of Investigation, the South Carolina Highway Patrol and the Ontario Provincial Police have adopted the pistol as standard.
 Glock P80: Introduced in 2020, the P80 was commissioned by United States firearms distributor Lipsey's to create an exclusive commemorative Glock model, the Pistole 80. The P80 is a throwback to the original Glock 17 Gen 1 type pistol chambered in 9×19mm with original Gen 1 frame and stippling and Gen 2 / Gen 3 internals.

 Glock 18: The Glock 18 is a selective-fire variant of the Glock 17, developed at the request of the Austrian counter-terrorist unit EKO Cobra, and as a way to internally test Glock components under high strain conditions. Originally produced in 1986, this machine pistol–class firearm has a lever-type fire-control selector switch, installed on the serrated portion of the rear left side of the slide. With the selector lever in the bottom position, the pistol fires fully automatically at a cyclic rate of 1,100–1,200 RPM (rounds per minute), and with the selector lever in the top position, the pistol fires semi-automatically. The firearm is typically used with an extended 33-round-capacity magazine and may be fired with or without a shoulder stock, although other magazines from the Glock 17 can be used, with available capacities of 10, 17, 19 or 24 rounds. Unlike all its other pistols, it is only offered to military, law enforcement, and government organizations. Early Glock 18 models were ported to reduce muzzle rise during automatic fire. A very early design introduced a longer ported barrel which was soon discarded as it would not fit in a holster. Another compensated variant was produced, known as the Glock 18C. It has a keyhole opening cut into the forward portion of the slide, similar to the opening on the Glock long-slide models, although the Glock 18 has a standard-length slide. The keyhole opening provides an area to allow the four, progressively larger (from back to front) compensator cuts machined into the barrel to vent the propellant gases upwards, affording more control over the rapid-firing machine pistol.
 Glock 18C: The compensator cuts start about halfway back on the top of the barrel. The two rear cuts are narrower than the two front cuts. The slide is hollowed, or dished-out, in a rectangular pattern between the rear of the ejection port and the rear sight. The rate of fire in fully automatic mode is around 1,100–1,200 rounds per minute. Most of the other characteristics are equivalent to the Glock 17, although the slide, frame, and certain fire-control parts of the Glock 18 are not interchangeable with other Glock models.
 Glock 19: The Glock 19  is effectively a reduced-size Glock 17, called the "Compact" by the manufacturer. It was first produced in 1988, primarily for military and law enforcement. The pistol is compatible with factory magazines from the Glock 17 and Glock 18, giving the Glock 19 available capacities of: 17 rounds (standard magazine with +2 extension), 10, 17, and 19 (standard Glock 17 magazine with +2), 24 and 26 (standard magazine with +2 extension) and the 31 (standard Glock 18 magazine with +2 removed) and 33 rounds of the Glock 18. To preserve the operational reliability of the short recoil system, the mass of the slide remains the same as in the Glock 17 from which it is derived. With the exception of the slide, frame, barrel, locking block, recoil spring, guide rod, and slide lock spring, all of the other components are interchangeable between the models 17 and 19. The Glock 19 Gen 4 MOS (Modular Optic System) has also been used by Special Operations Forces as the MK27 MOD 2. 

 Glock 19X: The 19X is the civilian version of Glock's entry to the XM17 Modular Handgun System competition for the US Military. It features a Glock 19 slide with a Glock 17 frame in coyote color instead of the regular Glock black color. The frame includes a lanyard loop and a front lip in the magazine which purpose is to make changing magazines with gloves on easier, but this means the new Gen 5 17-round magazines cannot be used in the Glock 19X because the front lip will block the extended magazine floor plates from locking into the 19X's magazine well. This can be remedied by switching to a Gen 4–style magazine floor plate or with a factory +2 extension. The 19X comes standard with night sights and includes one 17-round magazine and two 19-round magazines, all in coyote color. The Glock 19X has proven to be one of Glock's best selling pistols, with over 100,000 sold within 6 months of the 19X first being released.
 Glock 19M: Introduced in 2016, the 19M was created in response to an FBI solicitation for a new compact 9mm pistol. Differences from the Generation 4 model include removal of the finger grooves, ambidextrous slide lock, rounded slide nose profile, flared magazine well with new magazine baseplates, and a tougher finish on metal components. The Glock 19M also abandons the polygonal rifling of previous models for conventional rifling. The US Marine Corps fielded the Glock 19M, designated as the M007, to CID (Criminal Investigation Division) and Marine One personnel.
 Glock 19 Canadian: The limit for Restricted Class firearms in Canada is a 105mm barrel, so, due to its 102mm barrel, the standard Glock 19 is too short to be legal. Starting in 2017, a market specific Glock 19 has been sold in Canada with a 106mm barrel and a distinctive laser-engraved hollow maple leaf on the right side of the slide.

 Glock 26: The Glock 26  is a 9×19mm "subcompact" variant designed for concealed carry and was introduced in 1995, mainly for the civilian market. It has also been acquired by the US military and designated MK 26. It features a smaller frame compared to the Glock 19, with a pistol grip that supports only two fingers, a shorter barrel and slide, and a double-stack magazine with a standard capacity of 10 rounds. A factory magazine with a +2 extension gives a capacity of 12 rounds. In addition, factory magazines from the Glock 17, Glock 18, and Glock 19, with capacities of 15, 17, 19, 24, 31 and 33 rounds, will function in the Glock 26. More than simply a "shortened" Glock 19, design of the subcompact Glock 26 required extensive rework of the frame, locking block, and spring assembly that features a dual recoil spring.
 Glock 26 for U.S. Customs and Border Protection (CBP): This Glock is a Generation 5 Glock for the CBP that incorporates a flared magazine well with an extended, longer grip than that of the usual Gen 5 Glock 26. Moreover, the magazine well is flat across and has no bump as the Glock 25 Gen 5 or the G19X. In addition, it offers a Longer 11-round magazine.
 Glock 34: The Glock 34  is a competition version of the Glock 17. It is similar to its predecessor, the Glock 17L, but with a slightly shorter slide and barrel, to meet the maximum size requirements for many sanctioned action pistol sporting events. It was developed and produced in 1998, and compared to the Glock 17, features a  longer barrel and slide. It has an extended magazine release, extended slide stop lever,  trigger pull, and an adjustable rear sight. The sides at the front of the slide are slanted instead of squared. Further, the top of the slide and parts of its inside are milled out, creating a conspicuous hole at the top designed to reduce front-end muzzle weight to better balance the pistol and reduce the overall weight of the slide.
 Glock 43: The Glock 43 is a "slimline" version of the subcompact Glock 26 that features an ultracompact slide and frame. The Glock 43 is the first Glock pistol to be manufactured with a single-stack 9×19mm Parabellum magazine, having a standard capacity of six rounds and being unique to the model. Unlike other subcompact Glock pistols, the Glock 43 cannot use factory magazines from its larger relatives due to its single-stack magazine design. It also does not allow the removal of the backplate grip as is possible on the 4th gen Glocks.
 Glock 43X: The 43X is similar to the 43 except it has a longer and thicker grip for an increased magazine capacity of 10 rounds. The grip of the Glock 43X is comparable to the 48 and can be interchanged. Glock 43X magazines do not fit into the Glock 43, or vice versa. The 43X also features front slide serrations, a built-in extended beaver tail, a reversible magazine catch (similar to Gen 5 models), GMB rifling (again similar to Gen 5 models), and a two-tone finish (silver slide/black receiver). In the E.U. the 43X comes with a rail.

 Glock 45: The Glock 45  is a black colored version of the Glock 19X that incorporates Gen5 features catered for police use. The Glock 45 features a Glock 17 grip with a Glock 19 slide with front slide serrations. Unlike the Glock 19X, the Glock 45 features a flared magazine well like on the Gen 5 Glocks, but without the half moon cut at the front of the magazine well. The Gen 5 17-round magazines will work in the Glock 45, because unlike the 19X, the Glock 45 does not have the front lip on the magazine well that blocks the Gen 5 17-round magazine's extended floor plate from locking into the magazine well. The Glock 45 also deletes the lanyard loop found at the back of the grip on the 19X and comes standard with plastic sights instead of the night sights standard on the 19x.
 Glock 46: The Glock 46  is a "compact" version like the Glock 19. This model has a rotating barrel breech lock system. It had been designed as option to bid for a service pistol, with law enforcement agencies in Germany at state and federal level in mind. The differing breech lock system makes it possible to disassemble the firearm without the need to press the trigger, but only with no projectile chambered. Also, enhanced drop-safety is a must – the model complies with the specifications in the German technical guideline (Technische Richtlinie "Pistole") for service pistols. Police in Saxony-Anhalt chose the Glock 46 TR among three competitors and are to receive up to 8,600 new pistols until 2021 for over 6,400 officers, replacing their ageing Pistole 6 (P6), a SIG Sauer P225 variant. The state of Saxony-Anhalt is the first introducing a pistol made by Glock as standard issue sidearm into its force.
 Glock 47: The Glock 47  is a full-sized MOS version created for U.S. Customs and Border Protection that has full parts compatibility with a Glock 19, meaning a G47 slide can be put on a G19 frame to give the G19 a longer slide, barrel, and sight radius, or a G19 slide can be put on a G47 frame to create a pistol the functions like a Glock 45. The G47 also comes with magazines that have an extra extended base plate. G47 and G19 Gen5/MOS/MOD1/FS have modularity between both pistols. This means that the complete upper (Slide and Barrel) from G47 can be mounted on the G19 Frame and the complete upper (Slide and Barrel) from G19 can be mounted on G47 frame.
 Glock 48: The Glock 48  is a "slimline" version similar to the subcompact Glock 43 and 43X. All components of the Glock 48 are identical to the Glock 43X except the slide and barrel which are longer. The slides for the Glock 43, Glock 43X, and Glock 48 are functional on any of those three frames. The G48 features a 4.17-inch-long barrel, front slide serrations, a built-in extended beaver tail, a reversible magazine catch (similar to Gen 5 models), GMB rifling (again similar to Gen 5 models), a two-tone finish (silver slide/black receiver), and a magazine capacity of 10 rounds. In the E.U., Glock offers the 48 and the 43X with a rail.

9×21mm 

 The 9×21mm pistol cartridge was adopted and commercialized by Israel Military Industries for those markets (such as in Italy, and Mexico) where military service cartridges like the 9×19mm Parabellum, are banned by law for civilian use. Glock produces the Model 17, and other models, chambered in 9×21mm for these markets; however, Glock does not export or produce the 9×21mm pistols for the United States commercial market. This makes any 9×21mm Glock model a unique and highly desirable item for US firearm collectors. A limited number of 9×21mm Glocks have been imported to the US and are mostly held by collectors and gun enthusiasts.

10mm Auto 

 Glock 20: The Glock 20, introduced in 1991, was developed for the then-growing law enforcement and security forces market for the 10mm Auto. The pistol handles both full-power and reduced "FBI" loads that have reduced muzzle velocity. Due to the longer cartridge and higher pressures, the pistol is slightly larger than the Glock 17, having a roughly  greater width and  greater length. Though many small parts interchange with the Glock 17, with a close to 50% parts commonality, the major assemblies are scaled-up and do not interchange. The standard magazine capacity of the Glock 20 is 15 rounds. In 2009, Glock announced they would offer a  barrel as a drop-in option.
 Glock 29: The Glock 29 is a 10mm Auto equivalent of the subcompact Glock 26 introduced in 1997 along with the Glock 30 (.45 ACP). The pistol features a  barrel and a standard magazine capacity of 10 rounds. Like other subcompact Glock pistols, the Glock 29 functions with the factory magazines from its related full-size model, giving an optional capacity of 15 rounds.
 Glock 40: The Glock 40, introduced in 2015, is a 10mm Auto equivalent of the long-slide Glock 17L. The Glock 40 is only made with the "Gen4" frame and "MOS" (Modular Optic System) configuration.

.45 ACP 

Glock pistols chambered for the .45 ACP (and the .45 GAP) feature octagonal polygonal rifling rather than the hexagonal-shaped bores used for models in most other chamberings. Octagonal rifling provides a better gas seal in relatively large diameter rifled bores, since an octagon resembles a circle more closely than a hexagon.

 Glock 21: The Glock 21  is a .45 ACP version of the Glock 20 designed primarily for the American market. Compared to the Glock 20 chambered in 10mm Auto, the slide of the Glock 21 is lighter to compensate for the lower-energy .45 ACP cartridge. The standard Glock 21 magazine is of the single-position-feed, staggered-column type with a capacity of 13 rounds.
 Glock 30: The Glock 30  is a .45 ACP version of the subcompact Glock 29, with a standard magazine capacity of 10 rounds. The factory magazine from the Glock 21, with a capacity of 13 rounds, will function in the Glock 30.
The G30SF accepts the same double-stack .45ACP magazines as the G30 and G21.
 Glock 30S: The 30S is a version of the Glock 30 that features a thin slide (same slide as the G36), a Short Frame lower, and a double stack magazine. Like the G30, G30S magazines holds 10 rounds.
 Glock 36: The Glock 36  is a "slimline" version of the subcompact Glock 30 that features an ultracompact slide and frame and is chambered for the .45 ACP cartridge. The Glock 36 is the first Glock pistol to be manufactured with a single-stack magazine, having a standard capacity of six rounds and being unique to the model. The Glock 36 cannot use factory magazines from its larger relatives due to its single-stack magazine design.
 Glock 41: The Glock 41  is a competition version of the Glock 21, much like what the G34 is in relation to the G17; it features a 5.3-inch barrel and an elongated slide. The Glock 41 is only made with the "Gen4" frame.

.40 S&W 

 Glock 22: The Glock 22  is a .40 S&W version of the full-sized Glock 17 introduced in 1990. The pistol uses a modified slide, frame, and barrel to account for the differences in size and power of the .40 S&W cartridge. The standard magazine capacity is 15 rounds. The Glock Model 22 is favored and used by multiple law enforcement agencies around the world, including the Baltimore Police Department, Los Angeles Police Department, Miami Police Department, Maryland State Police, Overland Park Police Department, Kansas City Police Department, Missouri State Highway Patrol, and Alaska State Troopers in the United States; the NSW Police Force, Queensland Police Service and the Northern Territory Police Force in Australia; the Edmonton Police Service, Calgary Police Service, Alberta Sheriffs Branch, Winnipeg Police Service, Toronto Police Service, Ottawa Police Service, and British Columbia Sheriff Service in Canada; and the National Bureau of Investigation (Philippines), among others.
 Glock 23: The Glock 23  is a .40 S&W version of the compact Glock 19. It is dimensionally identical to the Glock 19, but is slightly heavier and uses a modified slide, frame, .40 S&W barrel, and a standard magazine capacity of 13 rounds. The factory 15-round magazine from the larger Glock 22 will function in the Glock 23.
 Glock 24: The Glock 24  is a .40 S&W long-slide variant of the Glock 22, similar in concept to the Glock 17L. Additionally, a compensated, ported-barrel version designated the 24C was also produced. The Glock 24 was introduced in 1994 and officially dropped from the company's regular product lineup upon the release of the Glock 34 and 35.
 Glock 27: The Glock 27  is a .40 S&W version of the subcompact Glock 26, with a standard magazine capacity of 9 rounds. The factory magazines from the larger Glock 22 and 23 will function in the Glock 27, increasing capacity to 13 or 15 rounds. Spacers are available that fit on these larger-capacity magazines themselves; they have the effect of "extending" the magazine well of the pistol, thereby improving the ergonomic feel of the pistol when the longer magazines are inserted.
 Glock 35: The Glock 35  is a .40 S&W version of the competition Glock 34. The Glock Model 35 was the service pistol for the Kentucky State Police, but by the summer of 2017, they had reverted from the Glock 35 back to 9mm weapons because of penetration improvements in the 9mm bullets, noting some officers had never been able to make the switch from 9mm to .40 S&W in the first place due to their struggles in mastering the higher caliber.

As is typical of pistols chambered in .40 S&W, each of the standard Glock models (22, 23, and 27) may be easily converted to the corresponding .357 SIG chambering (Glock 31, 32, and 33, respectively) simply by replacing the barrel. No other parts need to be replaced, as the .40 S&W magazines will feed the .357 SIG rounds.

.380 ACP 

The first two .380 ACP models are primarily intended for markets that prohibit civilian ownership of firearms chambered in military calibers such as 9×19mm Parabellum. Despite this, they are legally prohibited from being sold to civilians in the United States due to being manufactured in Austria and not meeting the import restrictions based on their caliber. They are also prohibited from ownership in Canada due to not meeting minimum barrel length requirements for handguns.

Due to the relatively low bolt thrust of the .380 ACP cartridge, the locked-breech design of the Glock 19 and Glock 26 was minimally modified for the Glock 25 and Glock 28 to implement unlocked breech operation. It operates via straight blowback of the slide. This required modification of the locking surfaces on the barrel, as well as a redesign of the former locking block. Unusual for a blowback design, the barrel is not fixed to the frame. It moves rearward in recoil until it is tilted below the slide, similar to the standard locked-breech system. The reduced size and mass of the Glock 42 required return to the Glock-standard locked-breech design.
 Glock 25: The Glock 25 , introduced in 1995, is a blowback derivative of the compact ( barrel) Glock 19. The magazine capacity is 15 rounds. Standard fixed sight elevation is 6.9 mm, unlike the 6.5 mm elevation used for the 9×19mm models.
 Glock 28: The Glock 28 , introduced in 1997, is a blowback derivative of the subcompact ( barrel) Glock 26. The standard magazine capacity is 10 rounds, but the 15-round Glock 25 magazine will function in the Glock28. Standard fixed-sight elevation is 6.9 mm, unlike the 6.5 mm elevation used for the 9×19mm Parabellum models.
 Glock 42: The Glock 42 , introduced in 2014, is a locked-breech "slimline" ( barrel) design. The single-stack magazine has a capacity of six rounds. It is Glock's smallest model ever made and is manufactured in the United States, which unlike the Glock25 and 28, allows it to be sold in the domestic USA market.

.357 SIG 

 Glock 31: The Glock 31  is a .357 SIG variant of the full-sized Glock 22. The standard magazine capacity of the Glock 31 is 15 rounds.
 Glock 32: The Glock 32  is a .357 SIG variant of the compact Glock 23. The standard magazine capacity of the Glock 32 is 13 rounds.
 Glock 33: The Glock 33  is a .357 SIG variant of the subcompact Glock 27. The standard magazine capacity of the Glock 33 is 9 rounds.

As is typical of pistols chambered in .357 SIG, each of the standard Glock models (31, 32, and 33) may be easily converted to the corresponding .40 S&W chambering (Glock 22, 23, and 27, respectively) simply by replacing the barrel. No other parts need to be replaced, as the .357 SIG magazines will feed the .40 S&W round.

.45 GAP 
Glock pistols chambered for the .45 GAP (and the .45 ACP) feature octagonal polygonal rifling rather than the hexagonal-shaped bores used for models in most other chamberings. Octagonal rifling provides a better gas seal in relatively large diameter rifled bores, since an octagon will have shorter sides and shallower angles than a hexagon.

 Glock 37: The Glock 37  is a .45 GAP version of the Glock 17. It uses a wider, beveled slide, larger barrel, and different magazine, but is otherwise similar to the Glock 17. The Glock 37 first appeared in 2003. It was designed to offer ballistic performance comparable with the .45 ACP in the frame size of the Glock 17. The concern with the size of the Glock 20/21 has been addressed by the Glock 36, 21SF, and 30SF, all of which featured reduced-size frames. The standard magazine capacity of the Glock 37 is 10 rounds.
 Glock 38: The Glock 38  is a .45 GAP version of the compact Glock 19. The standard magazine capacity of the Glock 38 is 8 rounds.
 Glock 39: The Glock 39  is a .45 GAP version of the subcompact Glock 26. The standard magazine capacity of the Glock 39 is 6 rounds.

.22 LR 
 Glock 44: The Glock 44 is a .22 LR (Long Rifle) rimfire model based on the Glock 19. While the Glock 44 is similar in size as the Glock 19, the Glock 44 has a magazine capacity of 10 rounds and uses a simple blow-back mechanism instead of a locked breech mechanism used on nearly all other Glock pistols. In addition, the Glock 44 is lighter than the G19, weighing in at just 12 ounces, and it retains Glock's popular polygonal rifling, which has been tested by Glock to work with lead .22 bullets. It uses a steel/polymer composite slide due to the lower slide weight needed for blowback.

Production in other countries 

Aside from the original Austrian company, Glock pistols are manufactured by the Glock Inc. subsidiary division located in the United States. Those batches are identical compared to the Austrian-made ones, but they are marked as "USA", instead of "AUSTRIA", on the slide. Glock 17 pistols are being assembled locally at army workshops of Uruguay to fulfill the needs of the national military services and law enforcement organizations.

The 205th Armory in Taiwan produces a copy of the Glock 19, named the T97 pistol. The Taiwan-made Glocks were made to replace the Smith & Wesson Model 5906 used by the Taiwan police, but it ultimately did not enter service. Turkish company Akdal Arms produces a pistol named the Ghost TR01, which is heavily influenced by Glock pistols in its design.

Russian firms such as Skat, ORSIS, and Izhmash assemble three models of Glock pistols locally: the Glock 17, 34, and 35.

Clones 
Third party frames and slides for Glock pistols began to appear in the early 2000s. This has led to "Glock" becoming a generic term encompassing pistols not made by Glock Ges.m.b.H. especially as expiring patents allowed for complete Glock clones to be made. As of 2019 a large number of American companies produced Glock clones.

There are three sidearms made by Iranian DIO's Shahid Kaveh Industry Complex which they call Ra'ad (has a safety selector, possibly an unlicensed copy of Glock 17), Glock 19 and Kaveh-17 (probably an improved Ra'ad, a variant of Glock 17S), which all of them are unlicensed clones of Glock pistols. It is not known if they could make their way to Iranian military and replace the Browning Hi-Power, M1911 and SIG P226 pistols and they were possibly some prototypes and have never gone on mass production.

The Tatmadaw of Myanmar have adopted a clone of the Glock 17 known as the MA5 MK II, which was first reported in 2018. They are currently being manufactured and adopted for Myanmar's special forces units.

In 2017, it was reported that Norinco was able to make a clone of the Glock 17 known as the NP-7 (or NP7). The pistol was subcontracted to Hunan Ordnance Industry Group through the Hunan Ordnance and Light Weapons Research Institute. Its features appear to be influenced by the fourth gen Glock 17. The NP7 is being marketed for export sales.

Unlicensed Glock clones are made in Pakistan's Khyber region, which were first reported in 2018.

Users

Criminal use in the US
Glock pistols have been used in mass shootings including the 1991 Luby's shooting, the 2007 Virginia Tech shooting, the 2011 Tucson shooting, the 2012 Aurora shooting, the 2012 Sandy Hook Elementary School shooting, the 2015 Charleston church shooting, the 2016 Orlando nightclub shooting, Pittsburgh synagogue shooting and the 2022 NYC subway shooting. Experts on gun control, mass shootings, and defense training have cited factors such as reliability, ease of use, and commonness. The criminal use of handguns including Glocks has led to calls for increased gun control in the United States. This common usage, however, has been described by Paul M. Barrett to be a result of Glock's overall popularity and market presence in the US and that "this level of violence isn’t necessarily tied to a particular[,] to a brand". In the late 80s, gun control advocates had similarly focused on Glock pistols because of their magazine capacity (compared to six shot revolvers), but also their "futuristic, distinct appearance". They were singled out for restriction by some jurisdictions and were branded the "hijacker's special" based on the false assumption that they could bypass airport metal detectors because of their polymer frame. This was refuted in Congressional hearings by the ATF, FAA, and other organizations responsible for airline security, which proved embarrassing for the bans' advocates and provided significant publicity for Glock. In April 2022, Ilene Steur, a survivor of the 2022 NYC subway attack, sued Glock and its Austrian parent company for compensation for her physical injuries and emotional pain.

See also
 Glock entrenching tool
 Glock knife

References

Bibliography

Further reading

External links 

 
 Glock Collectors Association
 Glock Charts at Teracube.net - models, specifications and dimensions

9mm Parabellum semi-automatic pistols
9mm Parabellum submachine guns
10mm Auto semi-automatic pistols
.357 SIG semi-automatic pistols
.380 ACP semi-automatic pistols
.40 S&W semi-automatic pistols
.45 ACP semi-automatic pistols
.45 GAP semi-automatic pistols
.22 LR pistols
Machine pistols
Police weapons
Semi-automatic pistols of Austria
Simple blowback firearms
Short recoil firearms
Weapons and ammunition introduced in 1982
Post–Cold War weapons of Myanmar